The Ruins of Isis is a novel by Marion Zimmer Bradley published in 1978.

Plot summary
The Ruins of Isis is a novel about the adventures of an anthropologist and her husband on a female-dominated planet.

Reception
Greg Costikyan reviewed The Ruins of Isis in Ares Magazine #1. Costikyan commented that "Ruins of Isis is by no means Bradley's best work; and her characters seem less well-realized than those of previous novels. On balance, however, the book is worth its [...] cover price."

Reviews
Review by Tom Easton (1980) in Analog Science Fiction/Science Fact, March 1980

References

1978 American novels
1978 science fiction novels
American science fiction novels
Novels by Marion Zimmer Bradley